WZAX (99.3 FM) is a radio station licensed to Nashville, North Carolina, United States. It serves the Nashville area. First put on the air by Mainquad Communications and previously featured "Dave and Allen in the Morning" with one member of the morning show in Roanoke Rapids and the other in Rocky Mount. The station is currently owned by First Media Radio, LLC.

History
WZAX signed on at 99.7 in 1997 as hot adult contemporary "New Mix 99-7". As of 2005, artists included Steve Miller, Jethro Tull, and Rod Stewart.

On November 11, 2009, WZAX changed their format to rhythmic oldies, branded as "Jammin' 99.3".

On November 30, 2014, WZAX dropped its "Jammin' 99.3" rhythmic oldies format and began stunting with a wide range of music as "99.3 What's It Gonna Be". The station launched a classic rock format branded as "99.3 Rock City" on January 5, 2015.

On November 30, 2017, WZAX dropped the "Rock City" branding and began stunting with Christmas music.

On January 1, 2018, WZAX ended its Christmas music stunt and launched a rhythmic hot adult contemporary format, branded as "Movin' 99.3".

References

External links

ZAX
Rhythmic adult contemporary radio stations